Basya Schechter is an American singer, songwriter, multi-instrumentalist, composer, producer, cantor, and music teacher. She is the lead singer and founder of the world/folk rock band Pharaoh's Daughter and has released two solo albums. She has also collaborated with the groups Darshan and The Epichorus.

Raised in the Hasidic Jewish community of Borough Park, Schechter left Orthodoxy after high school but maintained a love for the traditional Jewish music of her youth. Her own music often blends concepts from Jewish music with a variety of styles and sounds from Eastern Europe, the Arab world, and Africa, among others.

Early life
Schechter was born to an Orthodox Jewish family and grew up in the Borough Park neighborhood of Brooklyn, New York. Her father was in a short-lived barbershop quartet managed by Don Kirshner during the 1950s; after the group's demise, he returned to school and became an accountant. During Basya's childhood, he often sang with her on Shabbat and exposed her to Israeli artists like Tzvika Pick, Shimi Tavori, and Kaveret. Her parents divorced when she was nine; she went to live with her father, who remarried when she was 14. She has said that due to her chaotic family life, she was less restricted than others in her community.

She attended the local Bais Yaakov for much of her schooling, where she choreographed several high school dance performances. After high school, she briefly attended an Orthodox girls' seminary in Jerusalem before being asked to leave due to her rebellious behavior; she subsequently spent time in Egypt, where she was introduced to Arabic music. Returning to New York, she attended Barnard College as an English major, during which time she began writing and performing songs. In her late twenties, she held various jobs, including a brief stint as editor of the Street News homeless poet page, and went backpacking throughout Africa, the Aegean Region, and Kurdistan, studying the music and instruments of various countries.

Career

Pharaoh's Daughter

Schechter formed Pharaoh's Daughter in 1995 while in college. The band's name is a reference to Schechter's given name, a Yiddish variant of the Biblical daughter of Pharaoh, Bithiah.  They debuted in 1999 with the independent album Daddy's Pockets and were signed to Knitting Factory Records later that year. The label then released the band's second album, Out of the Reeds (2000). Their most recent album, Dumiyah, was released in 2014.

Solo career
Schechter released her debut solo album, Queen's Dominion, in 2004 on Tzadik Records. The album was conceived by Schechter and percussionist Jarrod Cagwin and was produced by her and Albert Leusink (Swingadelic, System Band).

In 2011, she released Songs of Wonder, an album of musical arrangements of the Yiddish-language poetry of Rabbi Abraham Joshua Heschel. She had been introduced to Heschel's poetry in 2005 after receiving a volume of it from a congregant at B'nai Jeshurun. Prior to its release, the album was premiered at Tzadik's Radical Jewish Culture Festival.

Other work
Schechter is a cantor and musical director for the Romemu congregation. She has also been the cantor at the Fire Island Synagogue since 2012. She previously played percussion during Friday night services at B'nai Jeshurun Synagogue on the Upper West Side. In 2015, she, Suzanne Vega, and Roma Baran provided vocal support at a Passover seder hosted by Laurie Anderson at Russ & Daughters. Later that year, she appeared with writer Shulem Deen at a Jewish Week-sponsored literary forum at Congregation Rodeph Sholom on the subject of leaving Orthodoxy. She is a former arts fellow at the Drisha Institute.

Personal life
Schechter was romantically involved with Rabbi Shaul Magid beginning in 2013, though their relationship ended in 2016.

Discography

Albums

Solo 
Queen's Dominion (2004, Tzadik)
Songs of Wonder (2011, Tzadik)

With Darshan 

 Deeper and Higher (2015)
 Raza (2017)

With Pharaoh's Daughter 

Daddy's Pockets (1999)
Out of the Reeds (2000)
Exile (2002)
Haran (2007)
Dumiyah (2014)

With Mycale 

 Mycale: Book of Angels Volume 13 (2010)

Other credits
 The Klezmatics, Rise Up! Shteyt Oyf! (2003) – chorus (on "Yo Riboyn Olam")
 Frank London, Divan (2003) – vocals
 Anthony Coleman, With Every Breath: The Music of Shabbat at BJ (1999) – percussion, background vocals
 Various, W.O.W. Women of Williamsburg Project – main artist ("In A Box")
 Sanda Weigl, Gypsy Killer (2002) – hand percussion
 B'nai Jeshurun Synagogue, Tekiyah: High Holy Days (2004) – vocals, percussion
 Dan Zanes, The Welcome Table (2008) – vocals, oud
 EarthRise Soundsystem, The Yoga Sessions (2010) – featured artist, oud
 The Epichorus, L'Oud and the Abstract Truth (2016) – kanjira

Filmography

Documentary appearances
Divan (2003)
Leaving the Fold (2008) – Canadian documentary on young men and women who left the Hasidic Jewish community, featuring former Hasidic Jews in the United States, Israel and Canada.
All of the Above: Single, Clergy, Mother (2014)

As composer
Thunder in Guyana (2003)
Beyond Eyruv (2006)
Leaving the Fold (2008)
Fidelity (2008)

References

External links
Pharaoh's Daughter official website

Living people
1969 births
American women singer-songwriters
Jewish American musicians
Pharaoh's Daughter members
Barnard College alumni
American world music musicians
Jewish folk singers
People from Borough Park, Brooklyn
Tzadik Records artists
Singers from New York City
21st-century American Jews
Singer-songwriters from New York (state)
21st-century American women